The Hawker Hurricane was a British single-seat fighter aircraft designed and predominantly built by Hawker Aircraft Ltd. Some versions were built in Canada by the Canada Car and Foundry Co Ltd

British variants

Hurricane Mk I

 Hurricane Mk I (Early production)

The first Mk I production machines were ready fairly quickly, with deliveries starting in December 1937. These early aircraft featured fabric-covered wings, and a wooden, two-bladed, fixed-pitch propeller. Initially the tailwheel was designed to be retractable; early on it was discovered that the Hurricane needed a larger rudder area to improve the control characteristics during a spin. To this end the lower part of the rudder was extended and a distinctive ventral "keel" was added to the rear fuselage. The tailwheel was now fixed.

Early Hurricanes lacked armour or self-sealing tanks. They used "ring and bead" gunsights, with the ring being mounted above the instrument panel and the bead mounted on a post above the engine cowling. The standard GM2 reflector gunsight was introduced in mid-1939, although many Hurricanes retained the "bead". Fuel capacity was 97 Imperial gal (441 L) in two fuel tanks, each of 34.5 gal (157 L) in the wing centre-section, between the spars; the fuel was pumped from these into a reserve gravity-feed tank which held an additional 28 gal (127 L) in the forward fuselage, just ahead of the cockpit. This was the main fuel feed to the engine. The 7 gal (32 L) oil tank was built into the forward, port centre section. Early "K" serialled Mk Is were powered by the 1,029 hp (768 kW) Rolls-Royce Merlin C engine; from the "L" serial numbers the later Merlin II of 1,030 hp (768 kW) was installed. The main coolant radiator was housed in a fairing under the rear wing centre-section; the oil cooler was also incorporated into the main radiator.

The aircraft handling qualities during take-off and landings were excellent due to a wide-track undercarriage with relatively wide low-pressure tyres. Because of this wide, stable platform the Hurricane was an easier aircraft to land, with less fear of nose-overs or "ground-loops" than its RAF Fighter Command counterpart the Supermarine Spitfire. During its operational life the Hurricane was able to operate from all sorts of adverse airfield surfaces with ease.

In flight the large, thick wing meant that the fighter proved to be a stable gun platform. It was armed with eight .303 in (7.7 mm)  Browning machine guns. The armament was arranged in two lots of four in large gun bays incorporated into the outer wing panels. In 1937 this firepower was enough to outgun the early marks of German Messerschmitt Bf 109, which were equipped with only four light machine guns. By the time of the Battle of Britain, it was recognised that this relatively small-calibre armament was inadequate; during the Battle of Britain it was relatively common  for Luftwaffe aircraft to survive numerous hits from .303 in (7.7 mm) bullets and still return safely to base. Later versions of the Hurricane were equipped with a more powerful arms package, initially 12 .303 in (7.7 mm) Brownings, and later four 20 mm (.79 in) Hispano cannon. Hurricanes built under licence by SABCA in Belgium featured four 12.7 mm (.50 in) FN-Browning guns instead of the .303 inch armament.

Hurricane MkI (Mid-late production)

In 1939, several changes were made to the Hurricane. The powerplant was changed to the Merlin III driving a de Havilland or Rotol constant speed metal propeller. Ejector exhaust stacks were fitted for added thrust. The fabric covered wings were replaced by re-stressed metal-covered wings. An armour-glass panel was incorporated on the front of the windscreen. The "rod" aerial mast was replaced by a streamlined, tapered design.

From about May 1940  70 pounds of armour plate protection was added in the form of head and back armour. Starting in September 1940, IFF equipment was installed. This weighed about 40 lb (18 kg) and could be identified by wire aerials strung between the tailplane tips and rear fuselage. Although the added weight and the aerials reduced maximum speed by about 2 mph (3 km/h), it allowed the aircraft to be identified as "friendly" on radar: lack of such equipment was a factor leading to the Battle of Barking Creek. At about the same time new VHF T/R Type 1133 radios started replacing the HF TR9 sets. The pilots enjoyed a much clearer reception, which was a big advantage with the adoption of Wing formations throughout the RAF in 1941. The new installation meant that the wire running between the aerial mast and rudder could be removed, as could the triangular "prong" on the mast.

At the start of the war the engine ran on the standard 87 octane aviation spirit. From March 1940 increasing quantities of 100 octane fuel, imported from the US, became available. This meant that during the defensive battles over Dunkirk the Hurricane Is benefited from an allowable increase in supercharger "boost" from 6 lb to 12 lb without damaging the engine. With the 12 lb "emergency boost", the Merlin III was able to generate 1,305 hp (973 kW) in a five-minute burst. If the pilot resorted to emergency boost, he had to report this on landing and it had to be noted in the engine log book.

In 1939, the RAF had taken on about 500 of this later design to form the backbone of the fighter squadrons during the Battle of France and into the Battle of Britain. The first RAF ace of the war, a young New Zealander known as "Cobber" Kain, flew a Hurricane with No. 73 Squadron. In June 1940, another wartime ace, Douglas Bader, was promoted to Squadron Leader and took command of No. 242 (Canadian) Squadron flying Hurricane Mk Is. The famous children's author Roald Dahl also flew Hurricanes with No. 80 Squadron in Greece and later in Syria, against the Germans and Vichy France.

Although some of the basic design elements of the aircraft were from an earlier generation, the Hurricane proved to be a match, to an extent, for the German Messerschmitt Bf 109E. In his book, Duel of Eagles, British ace Peter Townsend, who flew Hurricanes with No. 85 Squadron RAF during the Battle of Britain, provides examples demonstrating how the Hurricane's superior turning ability could offset the Bf 109's higher speed. This small turning circle often allowed a well flown Hurricane to get onto the tail of a 109 even more quickly than a Spitfire, assuming a 109 pilot was unwise enough to be lured into a turning match. Against the Hurricane was the aircraft's relatively slow acceleration and a top speed some  slower, depending on altitude. This meant that the 109 pilot often held the initiative when it came to breaking off or attacking during combat. At higher altitudes especially, the Hurricane was hard-pressed to keep up with a well flown 109, or even a Bf 110.

Lower down the situation was a little more even. The Merlin engine gave more power at low altitude than the Daimler-Benz DB 601 used in the Bf 109, on account of a different supercharger design. The DB601A-1 did not start to outperform the Merlin III and XII until above . The Merlin's only major drawback was a tendency to cut out during negative-g manoeuvres and inverted flight, on account of fuel starvation from the carburettor. This was temporarily fixed with "Miss Shilling's orifice", a simple modification. A direct- injection carburettor later solved the problem and eventually some versions of the Merlin used direct fuel injection.

When attacking Luftwaffe bombers, it was discovered that the Hurricane's fuel tanks were vulnerable to defensive machine gun fire. The greatest hazard was with the unprotected gravity-feed fuel tank in front of the cockpit which could rupture when hit, allowing a jet of flame to penetrate the cockpit through the instrument panel, causing serious burn injuries to the pilot. The wooden and fabric rear fuselage was also far more likely to catch fire than the metal fuselages of its contemporaries. This issue was of such concern to Air Vice Marshal Hugh Dowding that he had Hawker retrofit the fuselage tanks of Hurricanes with a fire-resistant material called "Linatex" as a matter of priority. The wing tanks had already been fitted with a covering of this sealant, but the fuselage tank was considered to be too small a target. Hurricanes were soon being modified at the rate of 75 per month. In one month of combat, 10 July 1940 to 11 August, defensive fire from bombers hit 25 Hurricanes and 25 Spitfires; as a result 11 Hurricanes were shot down compared with two Spitfires.

The biggest advantages of the Hurricane were that it was a relatively easy aircraft to fly, which was a boon when it came to squadrons being flooded with inexperienced pilots, and it was a steady gun platform. The closely grouped .303 in (7.7 mm) Brownings created a superior pattern of fire to those of the Spitfire, which were spaced out along the wings, and the armament was more quickly serviced. In spite of its vulnerabilities during the Battle of Britain, the Hurricane shot down the majority of the planes claimed by the RAF (1,593 out of 2,739 in total). Hurricane fighters were sometimes directed against slower bombers whilst the Spitfires attacked German fighters. By the close of the Battle of Britain in late 1940, production of the Spitfire had increased to the point where all squadrons could be supplied with them. In June 1940, the first Hurricane Mk I "Tropical" versions appeared. These featured a Vokes air filter in a large "chin" fairing under the engine cowling. Many of these aircraft were ferried to North Africa and Malta via France and the Mediterranean using fixed, cylindrical 40 gallon fuel tanks under each wing to extend the range. The tropical filter and fuel tanks were to be used on later variants of the Hurricane.

Hurricane Mk II

The improved Merlin XX (Mk.20) engine appeared in 1940 featuring a new two-speed supercharger that could have its impeller speed changed by the pilot depending on the outside air pressure (altitude). The carburettor air intake under the forward centre-section was redesigned and moved back . The more powerful engine was cooled by a 70% to 30% water glycol mix, rather than pure glycol used for earlier Merlin versions. This and the increased cooling requirements required a larger radiator and a redesigned, circular oil cooler housed in a deeper, slightly wider "bath".

Hurricane IIA Series 1
Although, by this time, production of the Spitfire had started to increase, a prototype of a Merlin XX powered Hurricane Mk I was built and first flew on 11 June 1940. The initial Mark II, is often known as the Mark IIA Series 1, but that is an unofficial designation, later mark II had their wing centre sections strengthened.  Mark II went into squadron service in September 1940 at the peak of the Battle of Britain. Hawker had long experimented with improving the armament of the fighter by fitting cannons. Their first experiments used two  Oerlikon cannons in pods, one under each wing, (one aircraft was tested during 1940 with 151 Squadron) but the extra weight and drag seriously compromised the aircraft's performance and manoeuvrability, and the limited amount of ammunition carried coupled with the frequent stoppages suffered by the drum-fed guns, meant the arrangement was unsatisfactory. A more reliable fit was made with four  Hispano Mk II cannon, two in each wing, but the weight was enough to seriously reduce performance. The Hispanos were designed for a rigid, engine based mounting and it was quickly found that the wings flexing in flight led to problems with the weapons twisting in their mounts as they fired, which caused gun jamming through misaligned shells. Changes made both to the Hispanos and to their mountings cured this problem. Small blisters on the upper wing surfaces were needed to clear the Hispano breeches and feed motors. The first sets of Hispano wings were modified from standard Mark I eight gun wings.

Hurricane IIB

Trials with 12 .303 in (7.7 mm) Brownings (four per wing in the original gun-bays and two more in new gun-bays outboard of the landing lights) were done in June and July 1940, production began at Hawker and Austin in February 1941.  These aircraft also featured a new longer propeller spinner.  The tailwheel recess on the ventral keel was changed in shape and the tailwheel leg became a levered-suspension unit with a small torque link.

Hurricane IIB Trop.
For use in North Africa; the Hawker Hurricane IIB, (and other aircraft), were tropicalised, or "trop". They were given engine dust filters and the pilots were issued a desert survival kit.

Hurricane IIC

The Hurricane II armed with four 20 mm (.79 in) Hispanos become the Mark IIC, using a slightly modified wing. Trials with a pair of external cannon as armament had begun in May 1939, then the internal arrangement in June to August 1940. 
In November 1940 thirty sets of Hurricane IIC (Four cannon) wings being built by semi tooled and hand methods in the experimental shop, using wings damaged in the region of the gun bay.

Test flights with external fuel tanks began in May 1940, the first mark II trials in June 1941.
Test flights carrying bombs began in April 1941, the first mark II trials with 500 pound bombs were in February 1942, most mark II were built as able or converted to carry external stores.  By then performance was inferior to the latest German fighters, and the Hurricane changed to the ground-attack role, sometimes referred to as the Hurribomber. The mark also served as a night fighter and "intruder."

Hurricane IID

Mk IIs were used in ground support, where it was quickly learned that destroying German tanks was difficult; the cannons did not have the performance needed, while bombing the tanks was almost impossible. The solution was to equip the aircraft with a 40 mm cannon in a pod under each wing, reducing the other armament to a single Browning in each wing loaded with tracers for aiming purposes.  The Hurricanes No. 6 Squadron, the first squadron equipped with this armament, were so effective that the squadron was nicknamed the "Flying Can Openers".  A winged can-opener became an unofficial squadron emblem, and is painted on present-day aircraft of 6 Squadron.

The layout was originally tested on a converted Mk IIB and flew on 18 September 1941. A new-build version of what was known as the Mk IID started in 1942, including additional armour for the pilot, radiator and engine. The aircraft were initially supplied with a Rolls-Royce gun and carried 12 rounds, but soon changed to the 40 mm (1.57 in) Vickers S gun with 15 rounds. The weight of guns and armour protection  had a marginal effect on the aircraft's performance.

The IID was used in anti-tank operations in limited numbers during the North African campaign where, provided enemy flak and fighters were absent, they proved accurate and highly effective against armoured vehicles and all motor transport.

Hurricane IIE

The Mk IIE. This designation was used by the Ministry of Aircraft Production in 1942 and 1943 for mark II factory fitted with wing racks, 270 delivered according to the Ministry, the RAF used the Mk IIB or C designation. The Mk IIE was not an early mark Mk IV.

Hurricane T.IIC
The T Mk IIC was a two-seat training version of the Mk. IIC. Only two aircraft were built for the Persian Air Force.l

Hurricane IIB Twin-seat
The Hurricane IIB Twin-seat is a two-seat variant of the Hurricane IIB which was built by modifying an existing Hurricane airframe. It first flew on 17 March 2020.

Hurricane Mk III
The Mk III was a Mk II equipped with a Packard-built Merlin engine, intending to provide supplies of the British-built engines for other designs. By the time production was to have started, Merlin production had increased to the point where the idea was abandoned.

Hurricane Mk IV

The Mk IV. The last major change to the Hurricane was to "rationalise" the wing, configuring it with a single design able to mount two 250 or 500 lb (110 or 230 kg) bombs, two 40 mm (1.57 in) Vickers S guns, or two 40 mm (1.57 in) Rolls-Royce B.H. type guns, or two SBC (small bomb containers) or SCI (smoke curtain installation), or two 45 or 90 gallon drop tanks, or eight "60 pounder" RP-3 rockets. Some sources say that the new design also mounted the improved Merlin 24 or 27 engines of 1,620 hp (1,208 kW) but this is disputed. It can be noted that all Merlin 27 were modified to Merlin 25 and used in Mosquitoes, there were only 16 production Merlin 24 by the time over 300 mark IV had been delivered and despite many Hurricane IV exports Merlin 24 exports were rare, and in accordance with the overseas York fleet. The individual aircraft cards held by the RAF museum reports the final mark IV had Merlin XX. Mark IV loss reports note the engine as Merlin XX.

They were equipped with dust filters for desert operations and an additional 350 lb (159 kg) of armour plating was added to the radiator housing, cockpit and fuel tanks.

The Mk IV was used in ground-attack missions in the European theatre until the early days of 1944, before being replaced by the more modern Hawker Typhoon. French ace Pierre Clostermann recalls in his book, The Big Show, that RP-3-equipped Hurricanes were limited to 205 mph (330 km/h) top speed due to the rockets' drag, and that Hurricane casualty rates against the lethal German flak were extremely high. In particular, Clostermann describes a rocket attack by Hurricanes from No. 184 Squadron RAF against a V-1 flying bomb launch-site on the French coast on 20 December 1943, in which three of the four aircraft were shot down before they could attack.  Problem, there was no such operation on 20 December, on 6 January 1944 two Hurricanes from 184 squadron were lost to flak.

Hurricane Mk V
One prototype and another two Hurricane Mk Vs were built as conversions of Mk IVs, and featured a Merlin 27 engine driving a four-bladed propeller, also tested with a Merlin 32. The ground attack role moved to the more capable Hawker Typhoon.

By this time, the Hurricane was no longer a frontline fighter in the United Kingdom. However, it still saw extensive service overseas as a fighter, playing a prominent role in the Middle East and Far East. It was also critical to the defence of Malta during 1941 and early 1942.

Canadian variants

Hurricane Mk X

Some production of the Hurricane was carried out in Canada by Canadian Car and Foundry Co Ltd.  Single-seat fighter and fighter-bomber. Mark number used by some RAF documentation to describe Canadian built mark I.  Not an official designation.  By the time Merlin 28 production began in the US 419 Canadian built mark I airframes had arrived in Britain.  Ultimately only 234 Canadian built Hurricanes arrived in Britain with an engine fitted, and they were quickly removed and fitted to Lancasters.

Hurricane Mk XI
Mark number never allocated, many references use it to describe the 150 Hurricanes shipped to Britain from the Canadian order for 400

Hurricane Mk XII
Originally designated the Mark IIB (Can), designation changed to mark XII in April 1943.  Single-seat fighter and fighter-bomber. Powered by a 1,300 hp (969 kW) Packard Merlin 29. Armed with twelve 0.303 in (7.7 mm) machine guns.

Hurricane Mk XIIA
The survivors of 30 Hurricane I transferred to the RCAF and upgraded to use the Merlin 29.  Armed with eight 0.303 in (7.7 mm) machine guns.

Sea Hurricanes

Sea Hurricane Mk I, 50 built by Canadian Car and Foundry.  Sea Hurricane Mk IIC, 60 built by Hawker. The RAF aircraft census as of end February 43 reports 50 Sea Hurricane I built, 378 converted, 36 out of an order for 60 Sea Hurricane IIC built.  A further 29 mark I, 52 IIB and 30 IIC were with the Admiralty.  RAF census as of end June 1944 reports 50 Sea Hurricane I built, 378 converted, 60 Sea Hurricane IIC built.  A further 19 mark I, 51 IIB and 76 IIC were with the Admiralty. Fleet Air Arm Aircraft 1939 to 1945 by Ray Sturtivant with Mick Burrow identify the following Hurricanes as having served, 101 mark I, 3 mark IIA, 30 mark IIB, 90 mark IIC, 1 mark IV, 16 mark Sea Ia, 281 mark Sea Ib, 2 mark Sea IIb, 109 mark Sea IIc along with other possibilities.  There is little evidence beyond possible trials of a Sea Hurricane mark Ic.

Sea Hurricane Mk IA

The Sea Hurricane Mk IA was a Hurricane Mk I modified by General Aircraft Limited. They were modified to be carried by CAM ships (catapult-armed merchantman). These were cargo ships equipped with a catapult for launching an aircraft, but without facilities to recover them. Thus, if the aircraft were not in range of a land base, pilots were forced to bail out and be picked up by the ship. They were informally known as "Hurricats". The majority of the aircraft modified had been worn out in front-line squadrons, so much so that at least one example used during trials broke up under the stress of a catapult launching. A total of 50 aircraft were converted from Hurricane Mk Is. CAM launched Hurricanes were used on eight operational sorties and the Hurricanes shot down six enemy aircraft, for the loss of one Hurricane pilot killed. The first Sea Hurricane IA kill was an Focke-Wulf Fw 200C Condor, shot down on 2 August 1941.

Sea Hurricane Mk IB

Hurricane Mk I version equipped with catapult spools plus an arrester hook. A total of 340 aircraft were converted. The first Sea Hurricane IB kill occurred on 31 July 1941, when Sea Hurricanes of 880 squadron, operating from Furious shot down a Do 18 flying-boat. The Fleet Air Arm preferred the lighter de Havilland propellers over the Rotol types; it was found during tests that the Rotol unit could lead to the nose dipping during arrested landings, causing the propeller blades to "peck" the carrier deck. The lighter de Havilland units avoided this problem.

Sea Hurricane Mk IC
Hurricane Mk I version equipped with catapult spools, an arrester hook and the four-cannon wing. From February 1942, 400 aircraft were converted. The Sea Hurricane IC used during Operation Pedestal had their Merlin III engines modified to accept 16 lb boost and could generate more than 1,400 hp at low altitude. Lt. Richard Cork was credited with five kills while flying a Sea Hurricane IC during Pedestal.

Sea Hurricane Mk IIC
Hurricane Mk IIC version equipped with catapult spools, an arrester hook and full naval avionics; 400 aircraft were converted and used on fleet and escort carriers.

Sea Hurricane Mk XIIA
Survivors of Canadian-built Sea Hurricane Mk I converted to use the Merlin 29.

See also

References

Bibliography

 Brown, Eric, CBE, DCS, AFC, RN.; William Green and Gordon Swanborough. Wings of the Navy, Flying Allied Carrier Aircraft of World War Two. London: Jane's Publishing Company, 1980. .
 Bungay, Stephen. The Most Dangerous Enemy. London: Aurum Press, 2000. 
 Fozard, John W., ed. Sydney Camm & the Hurricane. London: Airlife, 1991. .
 Mason, Francis K. Hawker Aircraft since 1920. London: Putnam, 1991. .
 Price, Alfred. The Hardest Day; 18 August 1940. New York USA: Charles Scribner's Sons, 1980. 
 Thetford, Owen. British Naval Aircraft Since 1912. London: Putnam Aeronautical Books, 1994. .

External links

 Mk XII with skis
 Sea Hurricane 1B data card

1930s British fighter aircraft
Lists of aircraft variants
Variants